BBC Kids is the international children's brand of BBC Studios, and has been applied to a number of TV services. It draws from the long history of children's programming on the BBC, and is strongly related to the CBBC channel in the United Kingdom.

History

2001-2018

2021-present

On 30 April 2020, Disney closed their Australian children's channels (Disney Channel and Disney Junior), and Cartoon Network and Boomerang became bound to an exclusive agreement with Foxtel in 2021. This left Fetch TV with little children's content. In response it commissioned BBC Studios to create a domestic BBC Kids channel. The channel launched on 24 April 2021. This complemented an existing CBeebies channel available in Australia, catering to children aged 0 to 6. At launch, all the programming of BBC Kids was already airing in the Australian market on ABC Me.

On January 11, 2022, BBC Studios added BBC Kids as an additional channel to the Pluto TV platform in the United States, both in English (as "BBC Kids") and in Spanish (as "Niños por BBC").

Taiwan Mobile myVideo has become the first streaming platform in Asia to launch BBC Kids as a Video on Demand channel, which was launched on July 1, 2022. The channel has included titles that had been previously aired on CBeebies Asia to bring along other titles that was tailored for kids audiences, such as Spy in the Wild and Deadly 60.

A BBC Kids subscription app service with 100 hours of content became available in South Africa in September 2022, through a partnership of Switch Media and MTN Group.

Distribution

Current distribution

Former distribution

References

External links
Australian website

International BBC television channels
Television channels and stations established in 2001
BBC Worldwide